Amloh is a city, sub-district and municipal council in Fatehgarh Sahib district in the state of Punjab, India. It is located near the industrial town of Mandi Gobindgarh.

History 

Amloh is a sub-district of Fatehgarh Sahib district. Amloh was founded by Faiz Baksh, the Governor of Sirhind. After the fall of Sirhind in 1763, Amloh was annexed by Raja Hamir Singh, the ruler of Nabha State. It was developed by the erstwhile ruler of Nabha State. The fort in the town was constructed by Raja Hira Singh of Nabha. It was given the status of Nizamat (District) headquarters.

Modern History 
After the creation of District Fatehgarh Sahib in 1992, Amloh was given the status of sub-divisional headquarters. Some part of the old building of the fort is now occupied by government offices.

However, the major portion of the fort is in a dilapidated condition. Amloh town is also a block and tehsil headquarters. This block consists of 100 Revenue Estates/villages. The total area of the block is 26,893 hectares. Paddy, wheat, potato, and sunflower are the main crops of the block. A sugar mill viz. Nahar Sugar & Allied Industries Ltd. has started functioning at village Khumna near Amloh on Khanna - Amloh road, due to which the cropping pattern of the block has changed. The block has adequate irrigation facilities.

All the villages of the block have been allotted among 13 branches of commercial banks under Service Area Approach. Besides, 11 branches of commercial banks are functioning at Mandi Gobindgarh. The block has five branches of Fatehgarh Sahib Central Coop. Bank Ltd. and 1 branch of Primary Agricultural Land Development Bank at Amloh.

Amloh is located at.

Amloh has the judicial court complex in the middle of the city.

Education 
There are several no. of schools in Amloh that are both government and privately owned. The students of Amloh's schools have performed good in academics and sports as well. The list of schools in Amloh is as below:

 Government Senior Secondary School (Boys)
 Government Senior Secondary School (Girls)
 Amloh Public High School (Goyal School)
 Pink Rose Public School (Annia Road)
 St. Farid Public School
 Lord Guru Nanak International School
 St. Xavier's Convent School, Bhadalthuha
 Desh Bhagat Global School
 Maghi Memorial Public School
 Government Elementary School
 Baby Modern High School
 Jyoti Playway School
 Sunrise Playway
 Maharishi Mehi Vidya Mandir
 Dashmesh Public School 
 Garden Valley International School

Apart from these, there are several other Government Schools.

Higher Education 
Desh Bhagat University which holds 2nd rank among the privately owned universities in Punjab is just 2.1 kilometers away from Amloh.

Maghi Memorial College for women is also catering for the higher education of women in Amloh.

Other Educational Institutes 
Apart from school and college education, there are several other institutes that provide educational services in different fields. 

 Canadian Express Immigration 
 AD immigration and ielts center
 Spark Education
 GD Infotech
 Touchstone Educationals
 Bluelap Study Centre

Healthcare 
The city of Amloh is served by Community Health Centre Amloh which is commonly referred to as "civil hospital".

References
 

 Cities and towns in Fatehgarh Sahib district